InteGraphic Systems is a former computer graphics chip company, created in 1993 in Santa Clara, California. The name was changed to IGS Technologies in 1997. In 2000, the name was changed again to TVIA after the company changed directions and went into making display processors and converters for TVs and other devices.

Products

 IGA 1680
 IGA 1682 with software MPEG playback
 IGA 1683
 CyberPro 2000
 CyberPro 2000A
 CyberPro 2010 (also sold with the Tvia logo)
 Video ExcelPro 2000
 CyberPro 3000 - PixelSquirt engine
 CyberPro 5000

External links
 TVIA website
 Overview of the CyberPro 3000 chipset

References 

Computer hardware companies
Companies based in Santa Clara, California
American companies established in 1993